Crassatellidae is a family of small saltwater clams, marine bivalve molluscs of the order Carditida.

Genera and species
Genera and species in Crassatellidae include:
 † Anthonya Gabb, 1864 
 Bathytormus Stewart, 1930
 Chattina M. Huber, 2010
 † Chattonia Marwick, 1929 
 Crassasulca H. E. Vokes, 1988
 Crassatella Lamarck, 1799
 Crassatella ponderosa Gmelin, 1791
 Crassatina Kobelt, 1881
 Crassinella Guppy, 1874
Crassinella dupliniana (Dall, 1903)
 Crassinella lunulata (Conrad, 1834) – lunate crassinella
 Crassinella martinicensis (d'Orbigny, 1842)
 Crenocrassatella Habe, 1951
 Elsius M. Huber, 2015
 Eucrassatella Iredale, 1924
Eucrassatella fluctuata (Carpenter, 1864)
 Eucrassatella kingicola (Lamarck, 1805) – thickshell clam
 Fluctiger Iredale, 1924
 Hybolophus Stewart, 1930
 Indocrassatella Chavan, 1952
 Kalolophus DeVries, 2016
 Kalolophus antillarum (Reeve, 1842)
 Kalolophus chipolanus (Dall, 1903)
 Kalolophus speciosus (A. Adams, 1854)
 Nipponocrassatella Kuroda & Habe, 1971
 Salaputium Iredale, 1924
 † Seendia R. Casey, 1961 
 † Spissatella Finlay, 1926 
 Talabrica Iredale, 1924
 Talabrica bellula (A. Adams, 1854)
 † Tilicrassatella DeVries, 2016 
 † Triplicitella K. S. Collins, Crampton & M. Hannah, 2015

References

 Powell A. W. B., New Zealand Mollusca, William Collins Publishers Ltd, Auckland, New Zealand 1979 
 Bieler, R.; Carter, J. G.; Coan, E. V. (2010). Classification of Bivalve families. Pp. 113-133, in: Bouchet P. & Rocroi J.-P. (2010), Nomenclator of Bivalve Families. Malacologia. 52(2): 1-184.
 Coan, E. V.; Valentich-Scott, P. (2012). Bivalve seashells of tropical West America. Marine bivalve mollusks from Baja California to northern Peru. 2 vols, 1258 pp.

 
Bivalve families